Gateh may refer to:
 Gateh Deh
 Gateh-ye Now